Herbert Corey Leeds (January 30, 1855 – September 29, 1930) was an American amateur golfer and golf course architect. Leeds tied for eighth place in the 1898 U.S. Open held at Myopia Hunt Club in South Hamilton, Massachusetts, a golf course of his own design. The U.S. Open was played at the Myopia Hunt Club four times, in 1898, 1901, 1905, and 1908.

Early life
Leeds was born in Boston, Massachusetts, on January 30, 1855. He graduated from Harvard University where, in addition to completing his Bachelor of Arts studies in 1877, he played baseball. Leeds was born into a wealthy family and was a life-long sportsman, being adroit at both sailing and golf.

It was no accident that he played so well at Myopia Hunt Club—he designed the course himself in 1894 and worked there for 30 years. And he would go on to build several other layouts in his career as a golf course architect. He also designed the private Bass Rocks Golf Club in Gloucester, Massachusetts, and the Kebo Valley Club in Bar Harbor, Maine. Also appearing on his dossier is the Palmetto Golf Club in Aiken, South Carolina, completed in 1895.  He was a member of the USGA executive committee in 1905.

Myopia Hunt Club
His course at Myopia Hunt Club measured 6,335 yards and within the confines of the course Leeds made certain that pars would not be easy, let alone birdies. Golfers were challenged with myriad features on the course such as tall mounds, numerous deep sand traps, long blind carries, deep swales, and extremely quick greens. For good measure Leeds added multi-tiered greens and deep gnarly rough.

To further menace the players' wayward shots he added a pond and a paddock. The golf course was so difficult that in the 1901 U.S. Open not a single professional in the field was able to break 80 in any round. Willie Anderson's 331 for four rounds is a record that has stood for 114 years and counting and remains the highest winning score ever in the U.S. Open.

Death
Leeds died on September 29, 1930, at the age of 75.

References

American male golfers
Amateur golfers
Golf course architects
Harvard Crimson baseball players
Sportspeople from Boston
1855 births
1930 deaths